Xanthochroa lateralis is a species of false blister beetle in the family Oedemeridae. It is found in North America.

References

Further reading

 
 
 
 
 
 

Oedemeridae
Beetles described in 1846